Abby Mukiibi Nkaaga is a Ugandan multi-award winning actor, comedian, director producer and radio personality, recognised for theatre plays, film,  television and radio. He is the founder of a Afri Talent, a Ugandan drama group and veteran radio presenter at 88.8 CBS in Kampala. He has played mostly military roles in films like The Last King of Scotland (film) (Masanga), Sometimes in April (Colonel Bagosora), The Silent Army (Michel Obeke) and The Mercy of the Jungle (Major). He was listed #1 on the list of the best ten Ugandan comedians by Big Eye in 2015.

Career

Theatre
Nkaaga started out as a supporting cast member at his uncle's Omugave Ndugwa's theatrical drama group called The Black Pearls in 1988. He worked on several productions but started getting recognition when he played a lead role on Ziribasanga Ne Sanyu. At the time such roles were reserved Fred Kalule , Ndugwa and Omulangira Kayondo, the big stars of the time. 
When Kato Lubwama who had been a member of The Black Pearls and some of his friends left The Black Pearls in 1993, Nkaaga also started Afri Talent with his other colleagues Ruth Wanyana, Brenda Nanyonjo, Michael Mabira, Bob Bulime and John Segawa. His breakout role in Afri Talent was when he acted as Chombe, a ruthless leader that didn’t care about the plight of soldiers’ families. His performance attracted UPDF army commander Gen Mugisha Muntu who praised Mukiibi for the performance. He received an award for Best Actor at the Uganda National Theater Awards in 1994 when he played Kabaka Muteesa II in Saagala Agalamidde. His other works in theatre include; Ekitangaala Munzikiza, Omuyaga Mu Makoola, Omusaayi Gw’obutiko, Olujegere Lw’obulamu, Galimpitawa with The Black Pearls and Order, The Best of Abby and Patricko, Ensitaano, Safari, Sebalamu, Tebesigwa, Mbyaase and Akandolindoli at Afri Talent.

Film
Mukiibi started appearing in films in 1996 and his debut film was Fire of Hope. In 2005, he played a lead villain role as Col Bagosora in an HBO film Sometimes in April, about the Rwandan genocide of 1994. His performance in Sometimes in April gave him recognition in the East African region and he started getting more international roles including a Hollywood role in The Last King of Scotland (film) in 2006 and a role in a South African film about the LRA war in northern Uganda called The Silent Army in 2008. He played a role of a Major in another Rwandan genocide film The Mercy of the Jungle in 2018. His other film roles include John in Imperial Blue (2019) and the Golomadi in the upcoming legal drama film Kafa Coh.

Radio
Abby Mukiibi was scouted by Daudi Ochieng and Peter Sematima to join radio in 1996 when they opened CBS radio. He started presenting the morning sports show Kalisoliso Wemizanyo and has presented it since then, remaining one of the longest serving radio personality in a show and at a radio station in Uganda. He later got promoted to the stations' programmes director.

Personal life
Nkaaga was born in Jinja to the late Haji Erias Simwogerere and the late Hajati Madina Simwogerere. He grew up in the Jinja Walukuba housing estates. He studied Music, Dance and Drama (MDD) at Makerere University. He is married to Stella Namatovu and they have four children.

Filmography

References

Living people
Ugandan actors
Ugandan radio presenters
Ugandan radio personalities
Ugandan theatre people
Year of birth missing (living people)
Makerere University alumni